Mayukh Hazarika (born 13 January 1971) is an Indian playback singer and music director from Assam. He is the frontman of Delhi based band Mayukh Hazarika and the Brahmaputra Balladeers. He is the son of legendary Assamese musician duo Jayanta Hazarika and Manisha Hazarika and nephew of Dr Bhupen Hazarika.

Biography

Early life and education
Mayukh Hazarika, also known as Raja, was born in Guwahati, Assam on 13 January 1971, to Assamese singers Jayanta Hazarika and Manisha Hazarika. He is the only son of musician duo. He was only seven years old when he lost his father. His mother taught him to sing from a very early age. Hazarika did his schooling from Kendriya Vidyalaya, Khanapara and later studied at University of Delhi. He completed his post-graduation from AJKMCRC, Jamia Millia Islamia University.

Early career
After passing out from IIM, Hazarika joined as Head of Camera at NDTV Lifestyle in 2007. Simultaneously, he was performing as a singer at various concerts in India and all around the world along with his wife and singer Laili Dutta Hazarika and mother Manisha Hazarika.

Music career

He shot into fame with his album 'Sokue Jodi Kotha Koy' which was released on 5 February 2009 and was promoted by Bharti Airtel. Before this he had been engaged in singing cover versions of Jayanta Hazarika and Bhupen Hazarika's hit songs. Although Hazarika embodies his father's cherubic voice, he has skillfully managed to create his own signature style over time.

Personal life
Hazarika lives in Bombay with his wife Laili Dutta Hazarika and daughter. His father, noted Assamese singer and music director Jayanta Hazarika, died on 15 October 1977 in Kolkata at the age of 34.

Discography
Shilongare Godhuli (2002)
Sokue Jodi Kotha Koy (2009)
Monor Maram (2012)
Assamese Modern Songs (2012)
All Time Greats Jayanta Hazarika (2012)
Anuradha (2012)
Assomor Chirajugamiya Geet (2012)

Singles
 "Sokuye Jodi Kotha Koi" (music: Aniruddha Barua) (2009)
 "Niyoror Xur" (music: Jim Ankan Deka) (2019)

See also
 Music of Assam
 Jayanta Hazarika
 Bhupen Hazarika
 Zubeen Garg
 Angaraag Mahanta

References

External links
 Mayukh Hazarika at iTunes
 Mayukh Hazarika at Saregama
 Mayukh Hazarika at Rdio
 Mayukh Hazarika at Saavn

Living people
1971 births
Indian male playback singers
Musicians from Guwahati
Singers from Assam
Indian male singer-songwriters
Indian singer-songwriters
Indian male pop singers
Assamese playback singers
Indian record producers
Kendriya Vidyalaya alumni